The 1983 Seiko World Super Tennis, also known as the Tokyo Indoor, was a men's tennis tournament played on indoor carpet courts at the Yoyogi National Stadium in Tokyo in Japan that was part of the 1983 Volvo Grand Prix. The tournament was held from 24 October through 28 October 1983. It was a major tournament of the Grand Prix tennis circuit and  matches were the best of three sets. John McEnroe was the defending champion but did not participate. First-seeded Ivan Lendl won the singles title, his eighth title of the season, and earned $75,000 first-prize money.

Finals

Singles

 Ivan Lendl defeated  Scott Davis 3–6, 6–3, 6–4
 It was Lendl's 7th singles title of the year and the 39th of his career.

Doubles

 Mark Edmondson /  Sherwood Stewart defeated  Steve Denton /  John Fitzgerald 6–1, 6–4

References

External links
 ITF tournament edition details

Tokyo Indoor
1983 in Japanese tennis
Tokyo Indoor